Goâve may represent:

 Rivière de Grand Goâve
 Goâve is a former town in Haiti, it was divided during the French colonial period into:
 Grand-Goâve
 Petit-Goâve